Georgii Nikolayevich Flyorov (also spelled Flerov, ; 2 March 1913 – 19 November 1990) was a Soviet physicist who is known for his discovery of spontaneous fission and his important contribution towards the crystallography and material science, for which, he was honored with many awards. In addition, he is also known for his letter directed to Joseph Stalin, during the midst of World War II, to start the Soviet program of nuclear weapons in the former Soviet Union.

In 2012, element 114 was named flerovium after the research laboratory at the Joint Institute for Nuclear Research bearing his name.

Biography 
Flyorov was born on 2 March 1913 in Rostov-on-Don in Russia. His grandfather was a priest in the Russian Orthodox Church—his mother was Jewish. After finishing schooling in 1929, he was trained as a mechanic and later as an electrician, first working as a technician at the Kirov Plant. In 1933–34, he was able to attend the Leningrad Polytechnic Institute (now known as the Peter the Great St. Petersburg Polytechnic University), and earned a specialist degree from the Polytechnic Institute in physics under Abram Ioffe's group in 1939. He found employment at the Ioffe Institute (then known as LFTI) and worked under Igor Kurchatov. Initially he worked with Mikhail Rusinov in fission applications in 1939  but discovered spontaneous fission in 1940 with Konstantin Petrzhak in 1940. 

He is known for writing to Stalin in April 1942 as a lieutenant in the Soviet Air Forces and pointing out the conspicuous silence within the field of nuclear fission in the United States, the United Kingdom and Germany. Flyorov's urgings to "build the uranium bomb without delay" eventually led to the development of the Soviet atomic bomb project.

In the 1970s, he claimed as his discovery two transition metal elements: seaborgium and bohrium.

He founded the Flyorov Laboratory of Nuclear Reactions (FLNR), one of the main laboratories of the Joint Institute for Nuclear Research in Dubna in 1957, and was director there until 1989.  Also during this period, he chaired the Scientific Council of the Soviet Academy of Sciences.

Honours and awards 

 Hero of Socialist Labour (1949)
 Two Orders of Lenin (1949, 1983)
 Order of the October Revolution (1973)
 Order of the Red Banner of Labour, three times (1959, 1963, 1975)
 Order of the Patriotic War, 1st class (1985)
 Lenin Prize (1967)
 Stalin Prize, twice (1946, 1949)
 Marian Smoluchowski Medal (1974)
 USSR State Prize (1975)
 Honorary Citizen of Dubna
 The element flerovium (atomic number 114) named after him

References

External links 

Significant Flerov Dates
Annotated bibliography of Georgy Flerov from the Alsos Digital Library
A draft of Flerov's letter to Stalin

Soviet physicists
Soviet nuclear physicists
Soviet inventors
Full Members of the USSR Academy of Sciences
People involved with the periodic table
Heroes of Socialist Labour
Recipients of the Order of Lenin
Lenin Prize winners
Stalin Prize winners
Recipients of the USSR State Prize
1913 births
1990 deaths
Burials at Novodevichy Cemetery
Peter the Great St. Petersburg Polytechnic University alumni
Soviet military personnel of World War II
Soviet Air Force officers